The 2019–20 Equatoguinean Primera División is the 42nd season of the Equatoguinean Primera División, the top-tier football league in Equatorial Guinea, since its establishment in 1979.

The season was originally to start on 15 December 2019, but was later postponed to 4 January 2020, and eventually started on 11 January 2020.

On 8 June 2020, The Equatoguinean Football Federation (FEGUIFUT) announced the tournament was abandoned due to the COVID-19 pandemic in Equatorial Guinea.

Teams
The 24 teams are divided into Región Insular and Región Continental, with 12 teams in each region. The following teams were promoted and relegated from the previous season:
In the Región Insular, Recreativo Lampert and Real X Balompié were relegated, and were replaced by promoted teams Real Rebola and Santa Isabel.
In the Región Continental, Atlético Bata, Unión Vésper and Racing de Micomeseng were relegated, and were replaced by promoted teams Hacía Club de Mbedumu, Inter Vesper and Inter Litoral.

Región Insular
Atlético Semu
Cano Sport
Ceiba
Deportivo Unidad
Estrella Roja
Leones Vegetarianos
The Panthers
Real Rebola
San Pablo de Nsork
Santa Isabel
Santa María
Sony Elá Nguema

Región Continental
15 de Agosto
AD Mongomo
Akonangui
Deportivo Anoney
Deportivo Mongomo
Deportivo Niefang
Dragón
Fundación Bata
Futuro Kings
Hacía Club de Mbedumu
Inter Litoral
Inter Vesper

Regional stage
The top three teams from each region qualify for the Liguilla Nacional. The bottom two teams from each region are relegated.

Región Insular

Región Continental

Liguilla Nacional

Results
Round 1 (11–12 January 2020): 
Round 2 (18–19 January 2020): 
Round 3 (25–26 January 2020): 
Round 4 (29 January 2020):
Round 5 (1–2 February 2020): 
Round 6 (8–9 February 2020): 
Round 7 (15–16 February 2020): 
Round 8 (22–23 February 2020): 
Round 9 (29 February–1 March 2020): 
Round 10 (7–8 March 2020):
Round 11 (14–15 March 2020): 
League suspended on 16 March 2020 for two weeks due to COVID-19.

References

External links
FEGUIFUT
RSSSF.com

Football leagues in Equatorial Guinea
Football
Football
Equatorial Guinea
Equatoguinean Primera División, 2019-20